Saúl Salcedo Zárate (born 29 August 1997) is a Paraguayan professional footballer who plays for Club Olimpia and the Paraguay national team.

International career
He was summoned for Paraguay national under-20 football team   to play 2015 South American Youth Football Championship. Salcedo was named in Paraguay's provisional squad for Copa América Centenario but was cut from the final squad.

On 2 March 2019, Salcedo received a call-up to the Paraguay national team from Eduardo Berizzo ahead of that month's friendlies with Peru and Mexico. On 10 September 2019, Salcedo made his senior international debut in a 4–2 friendly win away to Jordan.

References

External links
 
 
 

1997 births
Living people
Paraguayan footballers
Paraguayan expatriate footballers
Paraguay under-20 international footballers
Paraguay international footballers
People from Capiatá
Association football defenders
2015 South American Youth Football Championship players
Club Olimpia footballers
Club Atlético Huracán footballers
Paraguayan Primera División players
Argentine Primera División players
Expatriate footballers in Argentina
Paraguayan expatriate sportspeople in Argentina